Vĩnh Cửu is a rural district of Đồng Nai province in the Southeast region of Vietnam. As of 2003 the district had a population of 106,067. The district covers an area of 1122 km². The district capital lies at Vĩnh An. 

The Vĩnh Cửu nature reserve is an area of (mostly secondary) seasonal tropical forest and links directly with Cát Tiên National Park; together they provide contiguous habitat for a number of endangered species including yellow-cheeked gibbons, gaur and Asian elephants.  The Trị An lake (hồ) and dam form a substantial part of this district.

Administrative subdivisions 
The district is subdivide to a township and 11 rural communes, including:
Vĩnh An township
Bình Hòa commune
Bình Lợi commune
Hiếu Liêm commune
Mã Đà commune
Phú Lý commune
Tân An commune
Tân Bình commune
Thạnh Phú commune
Thiện Tân commune
Trị An commune
Vĩnh Tân commune

References

Districts of Đồng Nai province